Rudozem Heights (‘Rudozemski Vazvisheniya’ \ru-do-'zem-ski v&z-vi-'she-ni-ya\) are the heights rising to 1504 m (Glavinitsa Peak) at the base and in the interior of German Peninsula on Fallières Coast in Graham Land, Antarctica, extending 18.5 km in northeast-southwest direction and 13.7 km in east-west direction.  The heights are bounded by Bourgeois Fjord to the north and west, Dogs Leg Fjord to the south, and to the east by a glacier draining both northwards into Bourgeois Fjord and southwards into Dogs Leg Fjord.

The heights are named after the town of Rudozem in Southern Bulgaria.

Location
British mapping in 1978.

Maps
 British Antarctic Territory.  Scale 1:200000 topographic map. DOS 610 Series, Sheet W 67 66.  Directorate of Overseas Surveys, Tolworth, UK, 1978.
 Antarctic Digital Database (ADD). Scale 1:250000 topographic map of Antarctica. Scientific Committee on Antarctic Research (SCAR), 1993–2016.

References
 Rudozem Heights. SCAR Composite Antarctic Gazetteer
 Bulgarian Antarctic Gazetteer. Antarctic Place-names Commission. (details in Bulgarian, basic data in English)

External links
Rudozem Heights. Adjusted Copernix satellite image

Mountains of Graham Land
Bulgaria and the Antarctic
Fallières Coast